Mujiri is a Georgian surname that may refer to:
Shio Mujiri (b. 1969), Georgian Orthodox hierarch, bishop of Senaki and Chkhorotsku, Patriarchal locum tenens
Jaba Mujiri (b. 1980), Georgian football player
Davit Mujiri (b. 1978), Georgian football player
Amiran Mujiri (b. 1974), Georgian football player
David Mujiri (b. 1999), Georgian football player

Georgian-language surnames